Buln Buln East is a locality in West Gippsland, Victoria. At the 2016 census, Buln Buln East had a population of 164 mostly born in Australia.

See also
 County of Buln Buln

References

Towns in Victoria (Australia)
Shire of Baw Baw